The Boyne River is a river in the municipality of Grey Highlands, Grey County in Southwestern Ontario, Canada. It is part of the Great Lakes Basin, and lies entirely within geographic Artemesia Township.

Course
The river begins at Wilcox Lake and flows north under the Toronto, Grey and Bruce Railway line. It passes through Flesherton Community Pond at the community of Flesherton, then exits the pond over a weir and passes under Ontario Highway 10. It continues north and starts to descend the Niagara Escarpment by passing over the Hoggs Falls, named after William Hogg, takes in the right tributary Flesherton Creek, and continues downhill to its mouth at the Beaver River west of the community of Eugenia. The Beaver River flows to Georgian Bay on Lake Huron.

Tributaries
Flesherton Creek (right)

References

Sources

Rivers of Grey County